Gaillardia amblyodon, the maroon blanketflower, is a species of flowering plant in the aster family. It has been found only in the state of Texas in the south-central United States.

Gaillardia amblyodon  grows in open, sunlit locations on sandy soils. Each head has 8-12 red or purple (rarely yellow) ray flowers surrounding 30-60 disc flowers (yellow with purple tips). The species appears to be closely related to the more widespread G. pulchella.

References

External links
Nature Photography Challenge, FIVE x 365, 556 Maroon Blanketflower photo
Plant Illustrations, Gaillardia  links to old botanical illustrations of this and several other species

amblyodon
Endemic flora of Texas
Plants described in 1839
Flora without expected TNC conservation status